Stigmatophora conjuncta is a moth in the subfamily Arctiinae. It was described by Cheng-Lai Fang in 1991. It is found in China.

References

Moths described in 1991
Lithosiini
Moths of Asia